Wayne Jones (born 24 April 1965) is an English professional darts player who plays in Professional Darts Corporation (PDC) tournaments. He uses the nickname The Wanderer for his matches.

Career

Jones started his career in the British Darts Organisation in the late 1980s and reached the final of the British Open in 1990 (losing to Alan Warriner and the British Classic in 2000 (losing to Ritchie Davies) - but his best achievement was reaching the final of the prestigious Winmau World Masters in 1999 when Andy Fordham ended his hopes of a first major title.

He didn't make it to the Lakeside Country Club for the BDO World Championship until 2001, losing to Andy Fordham in the second round. He made it to the quarter-finals of the 2002 event by beating Tony Eccles and Ted Hankey but lost 1–5 to Martin Adams.

He then switched to the PDC and made his debut at their version of the World Championship in 2004. In 2006 he produced his best ever World Championship performance by reaching the semi-finals before losing to Peter Manley. In August 2010, he made his first PDC televised final appearance in the European Championships, losing to Phil Taylor. However this had guaranteed him a place in the Grand Slam of Darts in his home town of Wolverhampton in 2010 and 2011. At the 2010 tournament he produced quite a big upset in the quarter finals by beating Scotland's number one Gary Anderson, having trailed throughout the match, his never give up attitude earning him the last three legs to take victory 16–15 in a thriller. By reaching the semi finals of this competition where he lost to James Wade, it also guaranteed himself a place in the Grand Slam of darts for an extra year in 2012. He was beaten by James Wade in the semi finals.

In 2012 he reached the last 16 of the PDC World Championship for the first time since 2006. He comfortably beat Scott MacKenzie and Roland Scholten, before being whitewashed, 0–4, to defending champion Adrian Lewis. At the Dutch Darts Masters, Jones produced an upset by beating Phil Taylor 6–5 en route to the quarter-finals, before losing to Paul Nicholson in the semi-finals. After all 33 ProTour events of 2012 had been played, Jones was 32nd in the Order of Merit, gaining the final spot for the Players Championship Finals. He produced a big shock by whitewashing number one seed Dave Chisnall 6–0 in the first round, before bowing out of the tournament 7–10 to Peter Wright.

Jones lost in the first round of the 2013 World Championship to Dutchman Jerry Hendriks 3–0, after being narrowly edged out of each set by two legs to three. He was whitewashed 5–0 by James Wade in the second round of the UK Open. Jones reached his first semi-final on the Pro Tour in almost a year in September's eighth Players Championship but was beaten 6–1 by Ian White. He continued his form by reaching another semi later in the month at the German Darts Masters in a run which included wins over Michael van Gerwen and Gary Anderson, before Mervyn King beat him 6–4. His recent surge in form saw him qualify for the World Grand Prix, where he faced King again and this time beat him by two sets to nil. Jones won the first set of his next match against Dave Chisnall but lost 3–1. Jones was involved in a deciding leg in the first round of the Players Championship Finals and left 36 only for his opponent Brendan Dolan to take out 126 on the bull to defeat him 6–5.

Jones lost 3–2 to Kevin McDine in the first round of the 2014 World Championship as he missed a total of 26 darts at doubles during the match. He dropped out the top 32 on the Order of Merit afterwards as he was ranked number 33. Jones suffered a surprise 5–3 defeat to Jason Hogg in the second round of the UK Open. The only other major event Jones could qualify for during the year was the World Matchplay where he lost 10–3 to Andy Hamilton in the first round. He failed to advance beyond the last 16 of any event during 2014.

At the 2015 World Championship, Jones took a 2–1 set advantage over Dean Winstanley but lost the final two sets by three legs to one in a 3–2 defeat. It was his third first round exit in a row at the event. Jones lost in the second round of the UK Open 5–2 to Joey ten Berge. Three last 16 exits were the furthest he progressed in any tournament in 2015. Jones qualified for the Grand Slam, but lost each of his group fixtures against Michael Smith, Andy Fordham and Adrian Lewis.

Jones had played in every World Championship since 2005, but failed to qualify for the 2016 edition as he had dropped outside the last 32 on the Order of Merit, failed to win enough money on the Pro Tour and lost in the quarter-finals of the qualifier. A fifth successive second round exit in the UK Open occurred after he lost 6–5 to Andy Jenkins. His first quarter-final since 2013 came at the seventh Players Championship courtesy of defeating Ross Smith 6–1, Simon Whitlock 6–3, Vincent van der Voort 6–0 and Ian White 6–1. However, Jones lost 6–2 to Dave Chisnall. Jones dropped out of the top 64 during the year and played in Q School to try and earn a new Tour Card. He reached the last 32 on the third day, but over the course of event he did not win enough points and will not be able to play in the full schedule of PDC events in 2017.

However, Jones won back his tour card in 2018 after topping the Challenge Tour Order of Merit in 2017, which gave him another two years on the full PDC Circuit. Jones qualified for the 2019 PDC World Darts Championship, his first world championship in four years, as a qualifier on the ProTour Order of Merit. He drew the South-African born Devon Petersen in the first round. Jones went 2-0 down in sets but managed to level the match at 2-2, however Jones then missed six match darts in a last leg decider and lost the match 3–2 in sets.

Wayne Jones lost his Tour Card at the end of 2021 & Didn't manage to win it back at 2022 PDC Q School. As of this Wayne Jones was eligible to take part in the World Senior Events, He entered the qualifiers for the 2022 World Seniors Darts Masters and qualified on the 2nd day beating Robert Rickwood 6-4, When at Lakeside he beat Roland Scholten in the preliminary round 4-1 before losing in the Last 16 to Martin Adams 4-2

World Championship performances

BDO

 2001: Second round (lost to Andy Fordham 0–3)
 2002: Quarter-finals (lost to Martin Adams 1–5)

PDC

 2005: Second round (lost to Kevin Painter 2–4)
 2006: Semi-finals (lost to Peter Manley 0–6)
 2007: Second round (lost to Adrian Lewis 3–4)
 2008: First round (lost to Tony Eccles 0–3)
 2009: First round (lost to Robert Thornton 1–3)
 2010: Second round (lost to Simon Whitlock 0–4)
 2011: Second round (lost to Vincent van der Voort 2–4)
 2012: Third round (lost to Adrian Lewis 0–4)
 2013: First round (lost to Jerry Hendriks 0–3)
 2014: First round (lost to Kevin McDine 2–3)
 2015: First round (lost to Dean Winstanley 2–3)
 2019: First round (lost to Devon Petersen 2–3)
 2021: Second round (lost to Joe Cullen 0–3)

Career finals

Major finals: 2 (2 runners-up)

Career statistics

(W) Won; (F) finalist; (SF) semifinalist; (QF) quarterfinalist; (#R) rounds 6, 5, 4, 3, 2, 1; (RR) round-robin stage; (Prel.) Preliminary round; (DNQ) Did not qualify; (DNP) Did not participate; (NH) Not held

Performance timeline

References

External links
PDPA profile

English darts players
1965 births
Living people
Sportspeople from Wolverhampton
Professional Darts Corporation former tour card holders
British Darts Organisation players